Emanuel (Mannie) Ruben Piore (19 July 1908 – 9 May 2000) was a scientist and a manager of industrial research.

Piore was born on 19 July 1908 in Vilnius, Lithuania to a Jewish family.

Piore obtained an undergraduate and a PhD degree in physics, both from the University of Wisconsin–Madison. He worked at the Radio Corporation of America, the US Navy (where he became the first civilian to head the Office of Naval Research) and, subsequently, the Avco Manufacturing Corporation, before being hired as the first Director of Research of IBM.

Under his direction, the architect Eero Saarinen designed and build the IBM Thomas J. Watson Research Center at Yorktown Heights, New York. As Director of Research at IBM he encouraged basic research and the building up of a patent portfolio.  He also established the IBM Fellow program, which allowed top researchers to pursue their own interests for a period of time. He was promoted to vice president and group executive, and Chief Scientist and served IBM as a member of the board of directors and of the advisory committee to the board. In 1967, his leadership at IBM was recognized by the Industrial Research Institute when it awarded him the illustrious IRI Medal.

In 1976, the IEEE established the IEEE Emanuel R. Piore Award, for "outstanding achievement in the field of information processing". Piore was an elected member of the American Academy of Arts and Sciences, the United States National Academy of Sciences, and the American Philosophical Society. His daughter, Jane Piore Gilman, is a distinguished professor of mathematics at Rutgers University.  His son, Michael J. Piore is a professor of economics and political science at the Massachusetts Institute of Technology.

References

Further reading
 Herman H. Goldstine and Ralph E. Gomory. Biographical Memoirs: Emanual Ruben Piore. Proceedings of the American Philosophical Society 145(3):359–363, September 2001. 
 Eli Ginsberg, editor. Science and Academic Life in Transition: Emanuel Piore. New Brunswick, N.J.: Transaction Publishers, Rutgers—The State University, 1990.

1908 births
2000 deaths
Emigrants from the Russian Empire to the United States
University of Wisconsin–Madison College of Letters and Science alumni
IBM Fellows
Fellows of the American Physical Society
Members of the American Philosophical Society